John de Rygater (also Rigater) was an English medieval university chancellor.

Between 1239 and 1240, John de Rygater was Chancellor of Oxford University.

References

Year of birth unknown
Year of death unknown
English Roman Catholics
Chancellors of the University of Oxford
13th-century English people
13th-century Roman Catholics
English male writers